The 2008 Ibero-American Championships in Athletics (Spanish: XIII Campeonato Iberoamericano de Atletismo), was an athletics competition which was held at the Estadio Tierra de Campeones in Iquique, Chile from June 13 to the 15th. A total of forty-four events were contested, of which 22 by male and 22 by female athletes.

Iquique was selected as the host city for the event, in May 2006, at the Iberoamerican Athletics Confederation Congress (Congreso de la Confederación Iberoamericana de Atletismo). A running track was installed at the stadium specifically for the competition.

No championship records were set at an edition which has hampered by cold, windy whether in the Chilean city. Six national records were broken at the competition, however, including a Chilean record throw of 18.65 m by shot put winner Natalia Ducó, which was also a South American junior record. Ecuador's Bayron Piedra was another stand-out performer as he set a national record to win the 3000 metres, adding to his silver medal from the 1500 metres.

The competition was dominated by Brazilian athletes: seventeen gold medals were won by the country's athletes and it topped the medal table with a total of 44 medals – a third of those on offer. Colombia had the next most golds with five and Spain and Argentina took four each. The hosts Chile had two golds in their medal haul of eight altogether.

Medal summary

Men

Women

Medal table

Participation
Of the twenty-eight members of the Asociación Iberoamericana de Atletismo, nineteen nations sent delegations to the 2008 championships. This represented all the organisation's members but for Guinea-Bissau. A total of 322 athletes were set to take part in the competition  of which 316 actually participated.

 (33)
 (15)
 (64)
 (48)
 (23)
 (8)
 (7)
 (10)
 (5)
 (4)
 (17)
 (3)
 (1)
 (5)
 (6)
 (8)
 (30)
 (2)
 (27)

References

Day reports
Biscayart, Eduardo (2008-06-14). Shot putter Ducó extends South American junior record in Iquique - Ibero-American Champs Day 1. IAAF. Retrieved on 2011-01-03.
Biscayart, Eduardo (2008-06-15). Brazil leads after day 2 of Ibero-American Championships in Iquique. IAAF. Retrieved on 2011-01-03.
Biscayart, Eduardo (2008-06-16). Brazil takes Ibero-American Championships in Chile – Final Day. IAAF. Retrieved on 2011-01-03.
Results
Day 1 (archived)
Day 2 (archived)
Day 3 (archived)

External links
Video review from ITVNoticias 
Competition Technical Manual 

2008
2008 in athletics (track and field)
2008 in Chilean sport
International athletics competitions hosted by Chile
June 2008 sports events in South America